Marklund is a Swedish language surname. It may refer to:

People
Anton Marklund (born 1992), Swedish racing driver 
Göran Marklund (born 1975), Swedish football player and coach
Hanna Marklund (born 1977), Swedish football player
Henrik Marklund (born 1994), Swedish ice hockey player
Liza Marklund (born 1962), Swedish writer
Mattias Marklund (born 1974), Swedish guitarist
Petra Marklund (born 1984), Swedish singer
Sam Marklund (born 1993), Swedish ice hockey player

Other uses
Marklund convection, a physics process
Marklund Motorsport, a Swedish auto racing team

See also
Markland (surname)

Swedish-language surnames